Edwin Torres may refer to:

 Edwin Torres (judge) (born 1931), Puerto Rican New York Supreme Court judge and author of crime novels including Carlito's Way
 Edwin Torres (poet) (born 1958), Puerto Rican "Nuyorican Movement" poet
 Edwin Torres (cyclist) (born 1946), Puerto Rican Olympic cyclist